Monohardi is a reputed upazila of Narsingdi District in the Division of Dhaka, Bangladesh.

Geography
It has 47397 households and total area 193.87 km2.

This upazila is located near the Brahmaputra river. According to Banglapedia Monohardi is bounded by pakundia and katiadi upazilas on the north, shibpur upazila on the south, Belabo and Katiadi upazilas on the east, Kapasia upazila on the west.

Demographics
As of the 2011 Bangladesh census, Monohardi has a population of 275112. Males constitute 50.39% of the population, and females 49.61%. This Upazila's eighteen up population is 122359. Monohardi has an average literacy rate of 27.3% (7+ years), and the national average of 32.4% literate. According to Banglapedia, there are 1 municipality, 11 unions and 170 villages in this Upazila.

Administration
Monohardi Upazila is divided into Monohardi Municipality and 11 union parishads: Barachapa, Chalakchar, Chandanbari, Charmandalia, Daulatpur, Ekduaria, Gotashia, Kanchikata, Khidirpur, Lebutala, and Shukundi. The union parishads are subdivided into 119 mauzas and 165 villages.

Monohardi Municipality is subdivided into 9 wards and 12 mahallas.

Education

There are eight colleges in the upazila: Afazuddin Khan Mohila College, Barachapa Moha Biddalay, Barachapa Union Adarsha Degree College, Hatirdia Raziuddin College, Khidirpur College, Monohardi Degree College, Panch Kandi Degree College, and Sarder Asmat Ali Mohila College.

According to Banglapedia, Monohardi Govt. Pilot Model High School, founded in 1948, Chalak Char High School, founded in 1933, Chandanbari S A Pilot High School, founded in 1961, Hatirdia Sadat Ali Model High School (1941), Khidirpur High School (1912), LK Union High School (1950)  are notable secondary schools.

See also
Upazilas of Bangladesh
Districts of Bangladesh
Divisions of Bangladesh

References

Upazilas of Narsingdi District